Pandithevan is a 1959 Indian Tamil-language film, produced and directed by K. Subramanyam. The film stars M. G. Chakrapani, T. K. Balachandran, Rajasulochana and B. S. Saroja.

Cast and crew 
The following lists are adapted from the database of Film News Anandan.

Cast 

M. G. Chakrapani
Rajasulochana
T. K. Balachandran
B. S. Saroja
S. A. Asokan
T. P. Muthulakshmi
S. V. Sahasranamam
Ragini
J. P. Chandrababu
T. A. Mathuram

Crew 
Producer &
Director: K. Subramanyam
Story: K. Subramanyam
Screenplay & Dialogues: Muhavai Rajamanickam
Cinematography: U. Rajagopal
Editing: C. P. Jambulingam, S. Ratnasabapathi
Art: V. Rama Rao
Choreography: K. N. Dandayudhapani Pillai, K. G. Gopal
Photography: V. K. Sathasiva Rao

Production 
This is the last film directed by K. Subramanyam. The film was shot in Neptune Studios that later was named Sathya Studios. (Now, it houses the MGR Janaki College of Arts and Sciences.)

K. Subramaniam's wife was a co-music director to this film. Meenakshi Subramaniam was a music composer, a lyricist in Sanskrit and Tamil and an instrumentalist who played Veena, Violin and Harmonium.

Soundtrack 
Music was composed by C. N. Pandurangan and Meenakshi Subramanyam, while the lyrics were penned by Pattukkottai Kalyanasundaram, Muhavai Rajamanickam and Muthukoothan. Singer is J. P. Chandrababu. Playback singers are P. B. Sreenivas, Seerkazhi Govindarajan, S. V. Ramanan, T. V. Rathnam, A. G. Rathnamala, S. Janaki, K. Jamuna Rani, (Radha) Jayalakshmi, K. Rani, P. Leela and Gomathi.

References 

Films directed by K. Subramanyam
1950s Tamil-language films
Films scored by C. N. Pandurangan
Films scored by Meenakshi Subramanyam